Casein kinase I isoform epsilon is an enzyme that in humans is encoded by the CSNK1E gene.

Function 

The protein encoded by this gene is a serine/threonine protein kinase and a member of the casein kinase I protein family, whose members have been implicated in the control of cytoplasmic and nuclear processes, including DNA replication and repair. The encoded protein is found in the cytoplasm as a monomer and can phosphorylate a variety of proteins, including itself. This protein has been shown to phosphorylate proteins of the Period family of circadian rhythm proteins. A homolog of this mammalian protein can be found in Drosophila melanogaster. Known as doubletime, this protein also plays a role in the phosphorylation of proteins involved in circadian rhythms. Two transcript variants encoding the same protein have been found for this gene.

Interactions 

CSNK1E has been shown to interact with PER1 and AXIN1.

Inhibitors 
Selective
 PF-4800567

Non-selective
 PF-670462 (also inhibits CK1-δ)

See also 

 Casein kinase 1 isoform epsilon
 Casein kinase 1 family

References

External links
 
 PDBe-KB provides an overview of all the structure information available in the PDB for Human Casein kinase I isoform epsilon (CSNK1E)

Enzymes
Genes
Human proteins